A blind arch is an arch found in the wall of a building that has been infilled with solid construction and so cannot serve as a passageway, door or window. The term is most often associated with masonry wall construction, but blind arches are also found (or simulated) in other types of construction such as light frame construction. Some blind arches were originally built as open arches and infilled later. Others were originally built with solid infill as intentional stylistic elements.

See also 
 Blind arcade
 Lombard band
 Lesene

References

External links 

Description and photo
Glossary of Medieval Art and Architecture

Arches and vaults